Phyllocladus hypophyllus is a species of conifer in the family Podocarpaceae. It is found in Brunei, Indonesia, Malaysia, Philippines, and Papua New Guinea.

References

Podocarpaceae
Least concern plants
Taxonomy articles created by Polbot